Who Made the Sunshine (stylised in all caps) is the fourth studio album by American rapper Westside Gunn. When it was originally scheduled to be released on August 28, 2020, it was postponed following the death of Griselda Records collaborator DJ Shay from COVID-19. It was finally released on October 2, 2020, through Griselda, Shady, and Interscope.

Production was primarily handled by Beat Butcha and Daringer, except for four tracks which were produced by The Alchemist, ConductorWilliams and Just Blaze. It features appearances from Benny the Butcher, Conway the Machine, Slick Rick, Black Thought, Boldy James, Busta Rhymes, Smoke DZA, Jadakiss, El Camino, Armani Caesar, Estee Nack, Flee Lord, Keisha Plum, and Stove God Cooks. The album has yet to be released on physical media.

Critical reception

Who Made the Sunshine was met with generally positive reviews from critics. At Metacritic, which assigns a normalized rating out of 100 to reviews from mainstream publications, the album received an average score of 76 based on five reviews.

Track listing

Personnel
Westside Gunn - vocals (all tracks)
Conway the Machine - vocals (tracks 2, 11)
Benny the Butcher - vocals (tracks 2, 11)
The Alchemist - production (tracks 4, 6)
Just Blaze - production (track 11)
Armani Caesar - vocals (tracks 6, 11)
Keisha Plum - vocals (track 8)
Jadakiss - vocals (track 4)
A.A. Rashid - vocals (track 1)
Estee Nack - vocals (track 9)
Stove God Cooks - vocals (track 9)
Smoke DZA - vocals (track 9)
Black Thought - vocals (track 3)
Boldy James - vocals (track 4)
Flee Lord - vocals (track 9)
El Camino - vocals (track 9)
Slick Rick - vocals (tracks 7, 10)
Busta Rhymes - vocals (track 7)
Young Guru – mixing, mastering
Daringer - production (all tracks)
Beat Butcha - additional production (all tracks)
Brandon Burton – recording
Víctor Hugo Orozco – art direction

Charts

References

2020 albums
Shady Records albums
Albums produced by Just Blaze
Albums produced by Beat Butcha
Albums produced by Daringer (producer)
Albums produced by the Alchemist (musician)
Griselda Records albums
Interscope Records albums